The Northwest Ohio Athletic League (NWOAL) is a high school sports league in the U.S. state of Ohio. Beginning in 1926, it is officially the oldest athletic league in the state of Ohio.  The league sponsors many sports, including:  football, boys & girls cross country, volleyball, boys & girls soccer, wrestling, golf, boys & girls basketball, baseball, softball, and boys & girls track & field. The average school enrollment ranges from 250 to 450 students making it a small to mid-size school league. The NWOAL members have won a total of 26 team state championships.

Current members

Affiliate member

Former members

League history

1920s
The NWOAL began competition in 1926 with charter members Bryan, Delta, Liberty Center, Montpelier, Napoleon, and Wauseon.  The inaugural sports of competition are football, boys basketball, and track.
A dissatisfied Delta left in 1931 and was replaced by Defiance.

1950s
Baseball and golf are offered as sports for league competition in the 1953–54 school year.
Defiance was voted out of the league in 1954 for having an enrollment over twice the average of the smaller schools and for being dominant in league titles.  They left at the end of the 1954–55 school year.
Fairview and Paulding apply and are denied league membership in the 50s.
Swanton and Delta are invited to join and enter the NWOAL in 1957 after a tenure in the Maumee Valley League, this was Delta's second entry into the league.
Archbold is also invited at the same time and joins in 1960.
Wrestling becomes a league sport for the 1959–60 school year.
Ottawa Hills was considered for membership in 1959, but they never officially joined the NWOAL.  It was around this time that it became obvious that the smaller schools were not satisfied with the dominance Napoleon (and to a lesser extent, Bryan) were displaying in acquiring all-sports crowns.

1960s
In spring 1968, Defiance re-applied and was denied admission for NWOAL membership, making it evident schools of that size were not welcome in the league.  Talk began of Bryan, Defiance, and Napoleon joining up in another league separate from the NWOAL.
In 1969, the Northern Border League was formed by the smaller members of the NWOAL as a way for them to compete for league titles. Delta and Swanton withdrew from the NWOAL completely while Archbold, Liberty Center, Montpelier, Wauseon and the recently joined Evergreen become dual members of both the NBL and the now 7-member NWOAL.  Patrick Henry would also compete in the NBL after consolidating for the 1969–70 school year, although their football team wouldn't begin NBL play until 1970.  Competition between the five dual-league members counted in the standings for both the NWOAL and the NBL.
Cross country becomes a league sport in the 1969–70 school year.

1970s
Consolidated in 1969, Patrick Henry's football team joined the NBL in 1970.
In 1971, Evergreen left the NWOAL to solely compete in the NBL.
In the spring of 1972, the NWOAL began their first league championship season for a girls sport with track & field.
Volleyball became a league sport in 1973.
In February 1973, more tensions arose when Liberty Center considered leaving the NWOAL completely to compete solely in the NBL.  Napoleon also displayed intention of leaving the league they felt they were not wanted in, and it was widely believed that Archbold, Montpelier, and Wauseon would follow Liberty Center's suit.  This would have caused Bryan and Napoleon to be left without a league home.  Community support kept Liberty Center in the NWOAL, and the league sat on shaky ground for a few more years.
Girls basketball started up with the 1975–76 season.
In the spring of 1978, Napoleon finally left the NWOAL and sought competition from larger schools in the Great Lakes League.  Upon Napoleon's departure, the NBL folded and was absorbed by the NWOAL in the fall of 1978.  Patrick Henry joined for the first time while Delta, Evergreen, and Swanton returned again.

1980s
Girls cross country begins in 1981.
Softball became a league sport in the spring of 1987.

2010s
For the 2011–12 school year, girls soccer and bowling for both boys and girls begin as league sports.
Prior to the 2013–14 school year, the NWOAL made an alteration to the league constitution in order to make football scheduling easier on member schools.  The first option allows a 10th school to join the league without becoming a full member of the league, while the second option allows a current member to leave the NWOAL to play football in another league or as an independent.
In May 2014, the Toledo Area Athletic Conference approved adding Montpelier to its league for football only beginning with the 2016 season.  In early June 2014, Montpelier's school board voted to remain in the NWOAL for 2014–15, compete as a football independent in the 2015 season, and then for the 2016–17 school year, they joined the TAAC for football only, became a full-member of the Buckeye Border Conference, and remained an NWOAL affiliate for wrestling only.

League Facts
In 2017, the NWOAL crowned its first female league champion in wrestling as McKayla Campbell of Wauseon won the league championship for the 134 pound weight class at the league wrestling meet.
For the first time in league history, two teams qualified for the OHSAA boys state basketball Final Four in the same season in 2017, as both Archbold and Wauseon made the state Final Four in divisions 2 and 3 respectively.
Archbold's softball team set an OHSAA record by becoming the first team to win 12 consecutive league championships in softball after winning the title in the 2017 season. That streak ended in 2018, as Wauseon won the NWOAL softball title outright, marking the first time since 2005 that Archbold did not win a softball title.

League championships

Boys team champions

Note: Bryan won a spring golf title during the 1973–74 school year.

Girls team champions

Northern Border League (1969-1978)

History
For the 1969–70 school year, the Northern Border League was formed by the smaller-enrollment members of the NWOAL as a way to compete for league titles without Napoleon and Bryan. Delta and Swanton withdrew from the NWOAL completely while Archbold, Liberty Center, Montpelier, Wauseon and the recently joined Evergreen become dual members of both the NBL and the now 7-member NWOAL.  Patrick Henry would also compete in the NBL after consolidating for the 1969–70 school year, although their football team wouldn't begin NBL play until 1970.  Competition between the five dual-league members counted in the standings for both the NWOAL and the NBL.

Evergreen would withdraw from the NWOAL completely in 1971 and compete solely in the NBL.  In 1973, Liberty Center also considered dropping their NWOAL membership solely for the NBL, which led to speculation that Archbold, Montpelier, and Wauseon would do the same in order to avoid competing with Napoleon.  Evident that schools didn't want to play with Napoleon, the Wildcats started to look at other leagues for membership.  When Napoleon joined the Great Lakes League in 1978, the NBL disbanded completely and all 8 schools joined the NWOAL with Bryan.

Boys team champions

Girls team champions

Note: Delta won the 1974 regular season NBL volleyball championship while Archbold won the combined league tournament with the NWOAL.

State Championships

Fall sports

Winter sports

Spring sports

See also
 Ohio High School Athletic Conferences

References

External links
Detailed membership history of the NWOAL and NBL (June 1973)
NWOAL History from the Bryan Times, August 30, 1979
Evidence of the dual membership for schools in the NWOAL and NBL from September 22, 1969
Here comes another league Sept 4, 1969
Sports Talk by Herb Lewis, Nov 24, 1970
PH joins the NBL in 1970, takes football title in 1971, Oct 1975

Ohio high school sports conferences